Glyphipterix archimedica is a moth in the  family Glyphipterigidae. It is known from Zimbabwe.

The wingspan is about 8 mm. The forewings are bronzy-fuscous, the margins of the wing suffused with dark fuscous and the markings edged with dark fuscous suffusion. A slightly oblique whitish fasciate streak is found from the dorsum at one-fourth reaching more than half across the wing and there is a triangular whitish spot on the dorsum beyond the middle, its apex produced into a golden-metallic projection. Four equidistant somewhat oblique slender whitish streaks run from the costa, becoming violet-golden-metallic downwards, the first from before the middle, reaching nearly half across the wing, the second somewhat longer, third as long as the first, the fourth pre-apical, shorter and direct. There is an erect slender violet-golden-metallic streak rising from a pre-tornal whitish dot, almost touching the apex of the second costal streak and a slender violet-golden-metallic streak runs along the lower half of the termen, and an erect mark from the termen beneath the apex. The hindwings are grey.

References

Endemic fauna of Zimbabwe
Glyphipterigidae
Lepidoptera of Zimbabwe
Moths of Sub-Saharan Africa
Moths described in 1921